Anagyrus is a large genus of parasitic wasps from the family Encyrtidae. Anagyrus is distributed throughout the world. A subgenus of Anagyrus is known as Nesoanagyrus (Beardsley 1969)

Species
There are at least 247 species in this genus which consists of:

 Anagyrus abatos (Noyes & Menezes, 2000)
 Anagyrus abdulrassouli (Myartseva, Sugonjaev & Trjapitzin, 1982)
Anagyrus abyssinicus Compere, 1939
Anagyrus aceris Noyes & Hayat, 1994
Anagyrus aciculatus (Blanchard, 1940)
Anagyrus adamsoni Timberlake, 1941
Anagyrus aega Noyes, 2000
Anagyrus aegyptiacus Moursi, 1948
Anagyrus agraensis Saraswat 1975
Anagyrus alami Hayat 1970
Anagyrus albatus Myartseva, 1982
Anagyrus aligarhensis Agarwal & Alam 1959
Anagyrus almoriensis Shafee, Alam & Agarwal, 1975
Anagyrus amnicus Prinsloo, 1985
Anagyrus amoenus Compere, 1939
Anagyrus amudaryensis (Myartseva, 1982)
Anagyrus ananatis Gahan, 1949
Anagyrus antoninae Timberlake, 1920
Anagyrus aper Noyes & Menezes 2000
Anagyrus aquilonaris (Noyes & Hayat 1984)
Anagyrus arambourgi Risbec, 1955
Anagyrus aranzadii (Mercet 1921)
Anagyrus archangelskayae Trjapitzin, 1972
Anagyrus arenaria Prinsloo, 1985
Anagyrus argyrus (Burks 1952)
Anagyrus ashkhabadensis Myartseva, 1981
Anagyrus aurantifrons Compere, 1926
Anagyrus australiensis (Howard, 1898)
Anagyrus bambeyi Risbec 1951
Anagyrus belibus (Walker, 1837)
Anagyrus bellator (De Santis, 1972)
Anagyrus bellus (Girault 1921)
Anagyrus beneficians Compere, 1943
Anagyrus bermudensis (Kerrich, 1982)
Anagyrus bicolor Noyes & Hayat, 1994
Anagyrus bohemanni (Westwood, 1837)
Anagyrus bouceki Hoffer, 1953
Anagyrus brachyclavae (Wu & Xu, 2001)
Anagyrus brevicornis (Shamim & Shafee, 1985)
Anagyrus brevistigma De Santis, 1964
Anagyrus bugandaensis Compere, 1939
Anagyrus californicus (Compere 1947)
Anagyrus calyxtoi Noyes, 2000
Anagyrus cepio Noyes, 2000
Anagyrus cercides Noyes & Menezes 2000
Anagyrus chilensis (Brèthes, 1916)
Anagyrus chrysos (Noyes & Hayat, 1994)
jr synonym Aagyrus chrysos (Noyes & Hayat, 1994)
Anagyrus cilla Noyes & Menezes 2000
Anagyrus clauseni Timberlake, 1924
Anagyrus clavatus Sushil & Khan, 1996
Anagyrus coccidivorus Dozier, 1932
Anagyrus coccurae Sugonjaev, 1962
Anagyrus comptoni Noyes & Hayat, 1994
Anagyrus cooki (Girault 1919)
Anagyrus coxalis Noyes & Hayat, 1994
Anagyrus cristinae Noyes & Menezes 2000
Anagyrus dactylopii (Howard 1898)
Anagyrus darevskii (Trjapitzin 1965)
Anagyrus diffinis Noyes & Hayat, 1994
Anagyrus discolor Noyes & Hayat, 1994
Anagyrus diversicornis (Howard 1894)
Anagyrus dozieri Tachikawa, 1956
Anagyrus echion Noyes & Hayat, 1994
Anagyrus elgeri (Kerrich, 1982)
Anagyrus elizabethae Noyes & Hayat, 1994
Anagyrus elpis Noyes, 2000
Anagyrus emeljanovi Trjapitzin, 1972
Anagyrus ephyra Noyes & Hayat, 1994
Anagyrus eudora Noyes, 2000
Anagyrus euroto Noyes, 2000
Anagyrus fasciiscapus (Girault 1932)
Anagyrus fatimae Fatima & Agarwal, 1993
Anagyrus ferus Noyes & Hayat, 1984
Anagyrus flaviceps Timberlake, 1941
Anagyrus flavimesopleurum (Girault 1917)
Anagyrus floris Noyes & Hayat, 1994
Anagyrus foersteri (Girault 1915)
Anagyrus fraternus Perkins 1910
Anagyrus frontolatus Sushil & Khan, 1996
Anagyrus fujianensis Gu, 2004
Anagyrus fujikona Tachikawa, 1963
Anagyrus fusciventris (Girault, 1915)
Anagyrus fuscus Shi, Si & Wang, 1994
Anagyrus galinae (Myartseva, 1982)
Anagyrus gaudens (Kerrich 1982)
Anagyrus gemma Noyes, 2000
Anagyrus gracilis (Hayat, 1970)
Anagyrus gravis Noyes & Hayat, 1994
Anagyrus greeni Howard 1896
Anagyrus grenfelli Noyes & Hayat, 1994
Anagyrus hainanensis Noyes & Hayat, 1994
Anagyrus haloxyli Sugonjaev, 1968
Anagyrus hammadae Trjapitzin & Rozanov, 1972
Anagyrus hansoni Noyes & Menezes 2000
Anagyrus haroldi Noyes & Hayat, 1994
Anagyrus hayati Sushil & Khan, 1996
Anagyrus hebes Noyes, 2000
Anagyrus henanensis Shi, Si & Wang, 1994
Anagyrus hippocoon Trjapitzin, 1965
Anagyrus impar Noyes & Hayat, 1994
Anagyrus indicus (Subba Rao, 1967)
Anagyrus inermis Noyes & Hayat, 1994
Anagyrus insolitus (Howard 1897)
Anagyrus ishaqi Fatima, 1999
Anagyrus jacksoni Noyes & Hayat, 1994
Anagyrus jenniferae Noyes & Hayat, 1994
Anagyrus juani Noyes, 2000
Anagyrus jucundus De Santis, 1964
Anagyrus juno Noyes & Hayat, 1994
Anagyrus kamali Moursi 1948
Anagyrus kivuensis Compere, 1939
Anagyrus laeviceps Perkins, 1910
Anagyrus lampe Noyes & Menezes 2000
Anagyrus lebadeia Noyes, 2000
Anagyrus levis Noyes & Hayat, 1994
Anagyrus lineatipes (Girault 1919)
Anagyrus livens Noyes, 2000
Anagyrus lizanorum Noyes & Menezes 2000
Anagyrus loecki Noyes & Menezes 2000
Anagyrus longicornis Mercet 1923
Anagyrus longipennis Shafee, Alam & Agarwal, 1975
Anagyrus lopezi (De Santis, 1964)
Anagyrus luci Noyes & Hayat, 1994
Anagyrus lutescens Noyes & Hayat, 1994
Anagyrus major Perkins, 1910
Anagyrus malayensis Noyes & Hayat, 1994
Anagyrus malenotus (De Santis, 1972)
Anagyrus mandibularis Sushil & Khan, 1996
Anagyrus mangicola Noyes, 1990
Anagyrus maritzae Noyes, 2000
Anagyrus marquesanus Timberlake, 1941
Anagyrus matho Noyes, 2000
Anagyrus matritensis (Mercet, 1921)
Anagyrus mazaces Noyes & Hayat, 1994
Anagyrus minium (Mercet, 1921)
Anagyrus mirtesae Noyes & Menezes, 2000
Anagyrus mirus (Girault, 1915)
Anagyrus mirzai Agarwal & Alam 1959
Anagyrus mohani Sushil & Khan, 1996
Anagyrus montivagus (De Santis, 1964)
Anagyrus mumfordi Timberlake, 1941
Anagyrus mycale Noyes, 2000
Anagyrus narcicius Salazar, 1981
Anagyrus nesticoccus Dang & Wang, 2002
Anagyrus niger (Ishii, 1928)
Anagyrus nigrescens Compere, 1939
Anagyrus nigricans Perkins, 1910
Anagyrus nigriceps (De Santis, 1972)
Anagyrus nigricorpus Shafee, Alam & Agarwal, 1975
Anagyrus nigriflagellum (Girault 1915)
Anagyrus nigritus (Howard, 1898)
Anagyrus nishidai Noyes & Hayat, 1994
Anagyrus nitidus Trjapitzin & Rzaeva, 1967
Anagyrus novickyi Hoffer, 1953
Anagyrus obodas Noyes & Hayat, 1994
Anagyrus ocellatus Noyes & Menezes 2000
Anagyrus odacon Noyes & Menezes 2000
Anagyrus orbitalis Timberlake, 1941
Anagyrus paralia Noyes & Menezes, 2000
Anagyrus pergandei Dang & Wang, 2002
Anagyrus petronae Noyes, 2000
Anagyrus phaena Noyes & Menezes 2000
Anagyrus phasis Noyes, 2000
Anagyrus phya Noyes & Menezes 2000
Anagyrus pilosus Ishii, 1928
Anagyrus procles Noyes, 2000
Anagyrus pseudococci (Girault 1915)
Anagyrus pulcher (Ashmead, 1888)
Anagyrus pulchricornis (Howard 1894)
Anagyrus pullus Compere, 1939
Anagyrus punctifrons Timberlake 1941
Anagyrus putonophilus Compere 1947
Anagyrus qadrii (Hayat, Alam & Agarwal, 1975)
Anagyrus quadrimaculatus Xu & He 1996
Anagyrus ranchiensis Shamim & Shafee, 1984
Anagyrus rapo Noyes & Menezes, 2000
Anagyrus remotor Noyes, 2000
Anagyrus rhopaloides Noyes, 2000
Anagyrus rifens Noyes & Menezes 2000
Anagyrus rosichoni Noyes & Menezes 2000
Anagyrus rotundiceps (Girault, 1932)
Anagyrus rubellus (Annecke, 1974)
Anagyrus rubinae Noyes & Hayat, 1994
Anagyrus rugas Noyes & Hayat, 1994
Anagyrus rusticus (De Santis, 1964)
Anagyrus sabas Noyes & Hayat, 1994
Anagyrus saccharicola Timberlake, 1932
Anagyrus saintpierrei Girault, 1913
Anagyrus saipanensis Doutt, 1952
Anagyrus salazari Noyes & Menezes 2000
Anagyrus sameenae Noyes & Hayat, 1994
Anagyrus sawadai Ishii, 1928
Anagyrus scaea Noyes, 2000
Anagyrus scapularis Myartseva, 1982
Anagyrus schoenherri (Westwood, 1837)
Anagyrus scimitar Noyes & Hayat, 1994
Anagyrus securicornis Domenichini, 1953
Anagyrus semifulvus Girault, 1915
Anagyrus shahidi Hayat, 1979
Anagyrus siccus (Prinsloo & Annecke, 1976)
Anagyrus similis (Girault 1915)
Anagyrus sinensis Noyes & Hayat, 1994
Anagyrus sinope Noyes & Menezes 2000
Anagyrus smithi Doutt, 1952
Anagyrus sogdianus Sugonjaev, 1968
Anagyrus sophax Noyes & Menezes 2000
Anagyrus spaici (Hoffer, 1970)
Anagyrus spica (Girault 1921)
Anagyrus subalbipes Ishii, 1928
Anagyrus subflaviceps (Girault 1915)
Anagyrus subnigricornis Ishii, 1928
Anagyrus subproximus (Silvestri, 1915)
Anagyrus subtilis Noyes & Hayat, 1994
Anagyrus sucro Noyes, 2000
Anagyrus suia Noyes, 2000
Anagyrus surekhae Noyes & Menezes 2000
Anagyrus swezeyi Timberlake, 1919
Anagyrus tamaricicola Trjapitzin, 1968
Anagyrus tanystis De Santis, 1964
Anagyrus telon Noyes & Menezes 2000
Anagyrus tenuis Noyes & Hayat, 1994
Anagyrus terebratus (Howard 1894)
Anagyrus thailandicus (Myartseva, 1979)
Anagyrus theana Noyes, 2000
Anagyrus theon Noyes & Hayat, 1994
Anagyrus thoe Noyes, 2000
Anagyrus thyridopterygis (Ashmead, 1886)
Anagyrus tibimaculatus Agarwal, 1965
Anagyrus townsendi (Howard, 1898)
Anagyrus tricolor (Girault 1913)
Anagyrus trinidadensis (Kerrich 1953)
Anagyrus tristis Noyes & Hayat, 1994
Anagyrus trjapitzini Sharipov, 1983
Anagyrus tyana Noyes, 2000
Anagyrus tymber Noyes, 2000
Anagyrus umairi Noyes & Hayat, 1994
Anagyrus ussuriensis Sharkov, 1984
Anagyrus varithorax (Girault 1923)
Anagyrus villalobosi Noyes & Menezes 2000
Anagyrus vladimiri - mealybug biocontrol
Anagyrus vochos Noyes & Hayat, 1994
Anagyrus vulso Noyes & Menezes 2000
Anagyrus wayfoongi Noyes & Hayat, 1994
Anagyrus xanthogaster Perkins, 1910
Anagyrus yuccae (Coquillet, 1890)
Anagyrus zaitzevi Trjapitzin, 1972
Anagyrus zama Noyes & Menezes 2000
Anagyrus zubairi Noyes & Hayat, 1994
Anagyrus zygia (Trjapitzin, 1966)

References

Further reading

 Annals - Entomological Society of America. [College Park, Md., etc.]Entomological Society of America.
 Annals of the Entomological Society of America. [College Park, Md., etc.]: Entomological Society of America.
 Archiv für Naturgeschichte. Berlin: Nicolai, 1912-
 Archiv für Naturgeschichte. Berlin: Nicolai, 1835-
 Australian Hymenoptera Chalcidoidea / by A.A. Girault. Brisbane: Queensland Museum, 1912-1916.
 Bibliographia zoologica. Leipzig: Wilhelm Engelmann, 1896-1934.
 Bulletin - United States National Museum. Washington: Smithsonian Institution Press, [etc.];1877-1971.
 Bulletin / Illinois Natural History Survey. Urbana,State of Illinois, Dept. of Registration and Education, Natural History Survey Division, 1918-1985.
 Bulletin of the British Museum (Natural History). London: BM (NH) Bulletin of zoological nomenclature. London.
 Catalog of hymenoptera in America north of Mexico / prepared cooperatively by specialists on the various groups of Hymenoptera under the direction of Karl V. Krombein ... [et al.]. Washington: Smithsonian Institution Press, 1979-
 Catalogus Hymenopterorum hucusque descriptorum systematicus et synonymicus / auctore, C.G. de Dalla Torre. Lipsiae: G. Engelmann, 1894.
 Classification of the chalcid flies, or the superfamily Chalcidoidea, with descriptions of new species in the Carnegie museum, collected in South America by Herbert H. Smith. By William Harris Ashmead... Pittsburg: Carnegie institute, 1904.
 Destructive insects affecting Ohio shade and forest trees / J. S. Houser. [Wooster, Ohio: Experiment Station, 1918]
 Dictionnaire universel d'histoire naturelle: résumant et complétant tous les faits présentés par les encyclopédies, les anciens dictionnaires scientifiques, les oeuvres complètes de Buffon, et les... traités spéciaux sur les diverses branches de
 Paris: Chez les editeurs MM. Renard, Martinet et cie, rue et Hotel Mignon, 2 (quartier de l'École-de-Médecine); et chez Langlois et Leclercq, rue de la Harpe, 81; Victor Masson, Place de l'Ecole-de-Médecin 1847-1849
 Dictionnaire universel d'histoire naturelle. Par Ch. d'Orbigny avec la collaboration de mm. Arago... [et al.]. Paris, A. Pilon et cie [1867?]
 Die Natugeschichte des Cajus Plinius Secundus: ins Deutsche übersetzt und mit Anmerkungen versehen / von G.C. Wittstein. Leipzig: Gressner & Schramm, 1881-1882.
 Entomological News. [Philadelphia] American Entomological Society, 1925-
 Experiment station record. Washington: G.P.O., 1889-1946.
 Fauna hawaiiensis; being the land-fauna of the Hawaiian islands. by various authors, 1899-1913. Cambridge [Eng.]: The University press, 1913.
 Fauna ibérica. por Ricardo García Mercet. Madrid: Museo Nacional de Ciencias Naturales, 1921.
 Flora oder Botanische Zeitung: welche Recensionen, Abhandlungen, Aufsätze, Neuigkeiten und Nachrichten, die Botanik betreffend, enthält /herausgegeben von der Königl. Botanischen Gesellschaft in Regensburg. Regensburg: Die Gesellschaft, 1818-1965.
 Hymenoptera of America north of Mexico: synoptic catalog, second supplement / prepared by the staff and collaborators of the Hymenoptera Unit, Insect Identification and Parasite Introduction Research Branch, Entomology Research Division, Agricultural Research Service, under the Washington, D.C.: U.S. Dept. of Agriculture, 1967.
 Index to the literature of American economic entomology. Melrose Highlands, Mass. [etc.], American Association of Economic Entomologists [etc.], 1917-62.
 Index zoologicus. An alphabetical list of names of genera and subgenera proposed for use in zoology as recorded in the "Zoological record" 1880-1900, together with other names not included in the "Nomenclator zoologicu Comp. (for the Zoological society of London) by Charles Owen Waterhouse, and ed. London,Printed for the Society, 1902.
 International Catalogue of Scientific Literature, 1901-1914. London. Published for the International Council by the Royal Society of London 1901-1920
 Johnson's Gardeners' dictionary and cultural instructor. London,A. T. De La Mare printing and publishing co., ltd.[1916]
 Jornal de sciencias mathematicas, physicas e naturaes / Academia Real das Sciencias de Lisboa. Lisboa: Academia Real das Sciencias de Lisboa, 1866-1927
 Memoirs of the Queensland Museum. Brisbane, Queensland Museum, 1912-
 Occasional papers of the California Academy of Sciences. San Francisco: California Academy of Sciences,
 Pamphlets on forestry in Ohio. [1900?-]
 Proceedings of the Entomological Society of Washington. [Washington, etc.: Entomological Society of Washington]
 Proceedings of the Hawaiian Entomological Society. [Honolulu: Hawaiian Entomological Society]
 Proceedings of the United States National Museum. Washington: Smithsonian Institution Press [etc.]
 Psyche. [Cambridge, Mass.: Cambridge Entomological Club]
 Revision of the parasitic hymenopterous insects of the genus Aphycus Mayr, with some notice of related genera. By P. H. Timberlake. Washington,Govt. Print. Off., 1916.
 The Canadian entomologist. Ottawa [etc.] Runge Press [etc.]
 The Entomologist. London: Simpkin, Marshall & Co., [1877-]
 The Gardeners' chronicle: a weekly illustrated journal of horticulture and allied subjects. London: [Gardeners Chronicle], 1874-1955.
 The Review of applied entomology. [Farnham Royal, Eng., etc.: Commonwealth Agricultural Bureaux, etc.]
 The standard cyclopedia of horticulture; a discussion, for the amateur, and the professional and commercial grower, of the kinds, characteristics and methods of cultivation of the species of plants grown in the regions of the United States and Illustrated with colored plates, four thousand engravings New York, Macmillan, 1919 [c1914]
 Transactions of the Entomological Society of London. London, The Society.
 Zoologischer Anzeiger. Jena, VEB Gustav Fischer Verlag.
 Kairomonal response of the parasitoid Anagyrus spec. nov. near pseudococci to the sex pheromone of the vine mealybug.
 Foraging behavior of the mealybug parasitoid Anagyrus sp. nov. nr. sinope (Hymenoptera: Encyrtidae).
 Progeny fitness of the mealybug parasitoid Anagyrus sp. nov. nr. Sinope (Hymenoptera: Encyrtidae) as affected by brood size, sex ratio, and host quality.
 Chinese fauna of parasitic wasps on scale insects.
 Interference of ants (Hymenoptera: Formicidae) with biological control of the vine mealybug Planococcus ficus (Signoret) (Hemiptera: Pseudococcidae).

Encyrtidae